Massimo Mattioli (25 September 1943 – 23 August 2019) was an Italian artist and cartoonist. 

Mattioli debuted in 1965 in the periodic comic book Il Vittorioso with Vermetto Sigh. He was also published in Corto Maltese and Frigidaire. In fact, he was one of the founders of Frigidaire.

Later he moved to London, where he made comics for the Mayfair magazine. In the early 1970s, he created Pasquino for the Paese Sera newspaper. In 1973 he began his collaboration in the Il Giornalino, creating the character Pinky. In 1977, in association with Stefano Tamburini, he created the underground magazine Cannibale. In 1978, Cannibale published the first adventure of Joe Galaxy. In 1982, he created the Squeak the Mouse series, a parody of Tom and Jerry.

References

External links
 Official site

Italian comics artists
1943 births
2019 deaths
Comic strip cartoonists
Underground cartoonists
Italian humorists
Italian parodists
Italian magazine founders